Natalie Richard is a Canadian television personality, formerly a VJ on both the English-language MuchMusic and French-language MusiquePlus networks. On MuchMusic she hosted French Kiss for several years, which aired French language music videos. She also took the occasional acting role for television and film. She was most recently based in Montreal working on various television projects.

Notes

References
 

Living people
Year of birth missing (living people)
Much (TV channel) personalities
French Quebecers
Canadian VJs (media personalities)
Canadian women television personalities